Peter Costello (born 1957) is a former politician who served as Australian Treasurer from 1996 to 2007.

Peter Costello may also refer to:

 Peter E. Costello (1854–1935), American politician
 Peter Costello (author), Irish historian and biographer
 Peter Costello (footballer) (born 1969), English footballer